Tulip Computers was a Belgian professional cycling team that existed from 1990 to 1992. Its main sponsor was Dutch computer manufacturer Tulip Computers. This team should not be confused with the Spanish cycling team sponsored by Tulip Computers in 1990.

References

Cycling teams based in Belgium
Defunct cycling teams based in Belgium
Defunct sports teams in Belgium
1990 establishments in Belgium
1992 disestablishments in Belgium
Cycling teams established in 1990
Cycling teams disestablished in 1992